Adrenodoxin reductase (Enzyme Nomenclature name: adrenodoxin-NADP+ reductase, EC 1.18.1.6), was first isolated from bovine adrenal cortex where it functions as the first enzyme in the mitochondrial P450 systems that catalyze essential steps in steroid hormone biosynthesis.

Examination of complete genome sequences revealed that adrenodoxin reductase gene is present in most metazoans and prokaryotes.

Nomenclature 

The name of the enzyme was coined based on its function to reduce a [2Fe-2S] (2 iron, 2 sulfur) electron-transfer protein that was named adrenodoxin. Later, in some studies, the enzyme was also referred to as a "ferredoxin reductase", as adrenodoxin is a ferredoxin. In the human gene nomenclature, the standard name is ferredoxin reductase and the symbol is FDXR, with ADXR specified as a synonym.

The assignment of the name "ferredoxin reductase" has been criticized as a misnomer because determination of the structure of adrenodoxin reductase revealed that it is completely different from that of plant ferredoxin reductase and there is no homology between these two enzymes. With more proteins with a ferroxodin-reducing activity discovered in both families as well as novel families, this enzyme activity is now seen as an example of convergent evolution.

Function 

Adrenodoxin reductase is a flavoprotein as it carries a FAD type coenzyme. The enzyme functions as the first electron transfer protein of mitochondrial P450 systems such as P450scc. The FAD coenzyme receives two electrons from NADPH and transfers them one at a time to the electron transfer protein adrenodoxin. Adrenodoxin functions as a mobile shuttle that transfers electrons between ADXR and mitochondrial P450s.

It catalyzes the following reaction:

NADPH + 2 oxidized adrenodoxin —→ 2 reduced adrenodoxin + NADP + H

Gene structure
The cDNA for adrenodoxin reductase was first cloned in 1987. In both bovine and human genomes there is only a single copy of the gene.

Sites of expression

ADXR gene is expressed in all tissues that have mitochondrial P450s. The highest levels of the enzyme are found in the adrenal cortex, granulosa cells of the ovary and leydig cells of the testis that specialize in steroid hormone synthesis. Immmunofluorescent staining shows that enzyme is localized in mitochondria.
The enzyme is also expressed in the liver, the kidney and the placenta.

Enzyme structure
Adrenodoxin reductase has two domains that bind NADPH and FAD separately. The FAD and NADP binding sites of the enzyme were predicted by sequence analysis of the enzyme.

While the FAD-binding site has a consensus sequence (Gly-x-Gly-x-x-Gly) that is similar to other Rossmann folds in FAD and NAD binding sites, the NADPH binding site consensus sequence differs from the FAD-binding site by the substitution of an alanine instead of the last Gly (Gly-x-Gly-x-x-Ala). The location of these FAD and NADP binding sites were confirmed by the crystal structure of the enzyme.

References

External links

Further reading 

 
 
 
 
 
 
 
 
 
 
 
 
 
 
 

Enzymes